Honey Bee is a 2013 Indian Malayalam-language comedy thriller film, written and directed by Lal Jr, son of actor-director Lal. The film features Asif Ali, Bhavana, Baburaj, Sreenath Bhasi, Archana Kavi, Balu Varghese and Lal in the lead roles.

The story revolves around two friends Sebastian and Angel who suddenly discover their love for each other. They elope on the eve of the girl's marriage, much to the chagrin of her brothers. The film essays the lovers' struggle for survival.

It was released on 6 June 2013 and was a commercial success at the box-office.

Plot
Sebastian (a.k.a. Seban), Abu, Ambrose Perera, Fernando d'Silva (a.k.a. Ferno), Angel and Sara are close friends in Fort Kochi. Angel's brothers HC Michael, Martin, Father Collin, and Antony, nicknamed "Punyalanmar", are dangerous businessmen. Angel's family brings in a proposal for her from the city SI George.

Angel asks Seban if he has feelings for her, to which he says he does not, before she admits that she had feelings for him. However, on the night before her marriage, a drunk Seban breaks into Angel's house with his friends and proposes his love to her. He elopes with her that night with his friends' help. Ambrose, drunk and senseless writes a letter and leaves it in Angel's room to inform the Punyalanmar, that they helped Seban and Angel to elope. The next day Sebastian wakes up to see Angel with him. He is shocked to see her since he doesn't remember the previous night's events. Punyalanmar goes in search of them, and they are on the run. Punyalanmar destroys Sebastian's house and burns Ferno's house.

Seban and Angel decide to escape through the harbor. Abu, Ambrose and Ferno planned to confront and surrender to buy Seban and Angel time to escape. Punyalanmar captures Abu but Ferno and Ambrose threaten to kill their wives. Ferno calls Seban (who is on a boat) and says they are going to sacrifice themselves, and Ferno is stabbed by Michael's goon. Seeing Angel's brothers coming after them they decide to suicide. Seban and angel kiss each other passionately. then it is revealed in the flashback that her brothers did not kill Seban's friends and that they were also there with her brothers in the boat they were coming after. But without knowing this Seban and Angel jump into the sea after kissing each other. Seban's friends jump into the sea to save them. The film has a happy ending in which all are praying together at Punyalanmar's father's tomb. and then heading for Seban's and Angels wedding.

Cast

Asif Ali as Sebastian aka Seban
Bhavana as Angel
Baburaj as Fernando d'Silva aka Ferno
Sreenath Bhasi as Abu
Balu Varghese as Ambrose Perera aka Ambro
Archana Kavi as Sara Perera, Ambro's sister, a good friend of the team
Lal as HC Mikhael
Suresh Krishna as Father Cochin/Collin s
Assim Jamal as Antony
Amith Chakalakkal as Martin
Vijay Babu as SI George
Mythili Cameo
Staton Edward as Danny, Gang Leader
Praveena as Lisa
Melba Babu  as Ancy
Joy Mathew as Cleetus
Ponnamma Babu as ferno's mother
Reena Basheer as Abu's mother

Soundtrack

The film's soundtrack contains 3 songs, all composed by Deepak Dev. Lyrics by Kaithapram, Lal, Anu Elizabeth Jose.

Release
The filming was started in March 2013 and released on 7 June 2013 in 75 screens across Kerala.

Critical reception
The movie gained mixed to positive reviews from critics. Oneindia.in said, "Jean Paul Lal has chosen a good script, which is interesting. The director has tried to keep you engaged and glued to the screen throughout the movie. The suspense in the climax is also very interesting and sure to impress youth." Veeyen of Nowrunning.com rated the film 2.5/5 and said, "Honey Bee is a film to be savored like those quickie bites that you grab from a fast-food restaurant. Its damn fun while it lasts in your mouth and you swallow it without much of a thought, knowing all the while that it never had plans to offer you something to chew on."

Sequel

The crew had announced the sequel of Honey Bee immediately after the release of the movie. Later Lal Jr. teamed up with Asif Ali for the psycho-thriller Hi I'm Tony, which had Lal in the title role. Due to some reasons, the sequel was delayed for two years. Later, the director announced that apart from the original cast, Sreenivasan and Lena would also be seen essaying vital roles in the film. The sequel is released on 23 March 2017.

Sequel
A sequel Honey Bee 2: Celebrations was released and a making story of the sequel, Honey Bee 2.5 was released which was directed by Shyju Anthikkad.

References

External links

2010s comedy thriller films
Indian comedy thriller films
2010s Malayalam-language films
Indian chase films
2013 comedy films